The women's freestyle 63 kilograms is a competition featured at the 2017 World Wrestling Championships, and was held in Paris, France on 23 August 2017.

This freestyle wrestling competition consisted of a single-elimination tournament, with a repechage used to determine the winners of two bronze medals.

Results
Legend
F — Won by fall
R — Retired

Final

Top half

Bottom half

Repechage

References

External links
Official website

Women's freestyle 63 kg
World